St. Casimir Parish - designated for Polish immigrants in Maynard, Massachusetts, United States.

 Founded 1912. It was one of the Polish-American Roman Catholic parishes in New England in the Archdiocese of Boston.

The parish closed July 1, 1997. Parish records moved to the St. Bridget Parish.

References

Bibliography 

 Our Lady of Czestochowa Parish - Centennial 1893-1993
 The Official Catholic Directory in USA

External links 

 Roman Catholic Archdiocese of Boston
 Closed and Merged Parishes

1912 establishments in Massachusetts
Roman Catholic parishes of Archdiocese of Boston
Polish-American Roman Catholic parishes in Massachusetts
Churches in Middlesex County, Massachusetts
Roman Catholic churches completed in 1912
Maynard, Massachusetts